Milan Melvin "Milo" Komenich (June 22, 1920 – May 25, 1977) was an American professional basketball player. His brother was fellow professional basketball player Bill Komenich.

Collegiate career
Born in Gary, Indiana, he was the son of Serbian immigrants. 
Komenich, a 6'7 center, played collegiately at the University of Wyoming after a standout high school career at Lew Wallace High School in Gary, Indiana.  He played for the Cowboys from 1941–1943 and for the 1945–46 season.  Alongside guard Ken Sailors, Komenich led the Cowboys to the 1943 National Championship.

Komenich was named an All-American in 1943 and 1946.  He was elected to the University of Wyoming athletics Hall of Fame in 2006 and is also a member of the Indiana Basketball Hall of Fame.

Professional career

During the 1949–50 season, Milo Komenich played in 64 games for the Anderson Packers, averaging 9.9 points per game.  Komenich also played for the Fort Wayne Pistons of the National Basketball League and the Dow Chemical and 20th Century Fox teams of the AAU.

References

External links
NBA statistics
Indiana Basketball Hall of Fame page
Wyoming Athletics Hall of Fame page

1920 births
1977 deaths
All-American college men's basketball players
Amateur Athletic Union men's basketball players
American men's basketball players
American people of Serbian descent
Anderson Packers players
Basketball players from Indiana
Centers (basketball)
Fort Wayne Zollner Pistons players
Wyoming Cowboys basketball players